Oscar López (born 11 December 1937 in Lanús) is a retired Argentinian midfielder, and a current football manager.

López started his playing career in 1957 with Independiente. In 1960, he moved down a division to play for Banfield where he was part of the team that won the Argentine 2nd division in 1962.

In 1966 he had an unsuccessful spell with Boca Juniors which was plagued by injuries. He then played for   Quilmes before returning to Banfield where he retired in 1971.

López then went on to become a football coach. He has had spells as manager of many teams including Arsenal de Sarandí, Ferro Carril Oeste, Textil Mandiyú, Banfield, Deportivo Español, Quilmes and Huracán in Argentina. He has also coached in Armenia, where he won the league title with Pyunik Yerevan and coached the Armenia national team.

External links
 Oscar López at BDFA.com.ar 
 

1937 births
Sportspeople from Lanús
Argentine footballers
Association football midfielders
Club Atlético Independiente footballers
Club Atlético Banfield footballers
Boca Juniors footballers
Quilmes Atlético Club footballers
Argentine Primera División players
Argentine football managers
Argentine expatriate football managers
San Lorenzo de Almagro managers
Arsenal de Sarandí managers
Ferro Carril Oeste managers
Textil Mandiyú managers
Club Atlético Banfield managers
Deportivo Español managers
Quilmes Atlético Club managers
Club Atlético Huracán managers
Racing Club de Avellaneda managers
Sporting Cristal managers
Armenia national football team managers
FC Pyunik managers
Living people
Argentine expatriate sportspeople in Armenia
Expatriate football managers in Armenia